Along with parasites and disease, predation is a threat to sheep health and consequently to the profitability of sheep raising. Sheep have very little ability to defend themselves, even when compared with other prey species kept as livestock. Even if sheep are not directly bitten or survive an attack, they may die from panic or from injuries sustained.

However, the impact of predation varies dramatically with region. In Africa, Australia, the Americas, and parts of Europe and Asia predators can be a serious problem. In contrast, some nations are virtually devoid of sheep predators. Many islands that are known for extensive sheep husbandry are suitable largely because of their predator-free status.

Worldwide, canids—including the domestic dog—are responsible for the majority of sheep deaths. Other animals that prey on sheep include but are not limited to: felines, birds of prey, and feral hogs.

Relation to sheep behavior
Sheep flight behavior is cited in one major study in California as the major stimulus responsible for eliciting predatory behavior in coyotes. Even coyotes that had not previously been exposed to sheep demonstrated predatory behavior when exposed to them for the first time. Of particular interest was that coyotes with no previous prey-killing experience readily attacked and killed sheep when given the chance. The coyotes were likely to attack sheep that exhibited flight behavior even when these coyotes were not hungry. The same study also determined that dominant coyotes were more likely to attack sheep.

By region

North America
According to the National Agricultural Statistics Service, 224,200 sheep were killed in the U.S. by predators in 2004, comprising approximately 37% of all bovine deaths for that year. The sheep lost in that year represented a sum total of 18.3 million dollars for sheep producers. Coyotes were responsible for 60.5% of all deaths, with the next largest being domestic dogs at 13.3%. Other North American predators of sheep included cougars (5.7%), bobcats (4.9%), eagles (2.8%), bears (3.8%), and foxes (1.9%). Wolves, ravens, vultures, and other animals together made up the remaining 7.1% of deaths. As all NASS statistics on sheep only take into account sheep after docking, the American Sheep Industry Association estimates that an additional 50–60,000 lambs were killed (before docking) that were not a part of the count. The number of sheep lost to predators may also be higher when considering that reports are generally only made when there is a reasonable expectation that a producer will be financially reimbursed for the loss.

South America
In South America, the only widespread potential predators of sheep are cougars and jaguars, both of which are known to prey on livestock regularly. South American canids such as the Maned wolf and foxes of the genus Pseudalopex are also blamed for sheep deaths, but no evidence for a statistically significant amount of predation by most of these species has ever been presented. However, the culpeo is a threat to sheep, and is responsible for 60% of the predator losses in Patagonia.

Africa
Though large, the South African sheep industry is significantly hindered by the innumerable predators present in the country. Other African nations that rely on sheep face a similar problem.

Black-backed jackals are the most significant sheep predators of southern and eastern Africa. Jackal predation typically peaks during droughts when wild food is scarce and the sheep are weakened. Merino sheep tend to be the most vulnerable, due to their habit of scattering upon attack, unlike fat-tailed sheep which bunch together for defence. In Transvaal between 1965 and 1971, a study on the stomach contents of over 400 jackals showed that sheep constituted 6% of the diet of jackals living in game reserves, and 27% for those living near farming districts. A similar study in Natal revealed that sheep constituted 35% of the resident jackal's diet.

Australia and New Zealand
 The main Australian predator of sheep is the dingo, which is a large-enough danger to sheep to precipitate the construction of the world's largest fence: the Dingo Fence. Red foxes, also, may prey on 10-30% of lambs, costing Australians sheep breeders more than A$100 million annually. 
Annual baiting programs are conducted to reduce the number of dingoes and foxes. Uncontrolled domestic dogs also regularly menace and kill sheep. Occasionally wedge-tailed eagles will kill young sheep up to and including hogget size sheep. In contrast, New Zealand has no remaining large carnivores. The only wild animal known to attack sheep in New Zealand is the rare, unusual kea parrot endemic to the country's South Island. Also, feral dogs have been a problem.

Prior to their extinction in Tasmania the thylacine (Thylacinus cynocephalus), also called the Tasmanian tiger, was also a major predator of sheep.

British Isles
Brown bears are thought to have become extinct in the British Isles in the year 500, while the last wolves were wiped out in 1786. Today the only wild animals remaining as a tangible threat to lambs in the British Isles are the red fox, badger, and eagles.  Domestic dogs are also a common cause of predation of lambs and sheep (they can also sometimes die of shock after any attempted predation or attack). There are many anecdotal reports of badgers predating sheep or lambs, but very little solid evidence of attacks. Badgers will scavenge carcasses of animals that have died of other causes and do have the ability to kill lambs but there is little proof that this is anything other than an occasional occurrence. In an independent report on the impact of badgers it was reported that a Scottish survey of sheep farmers in 2019 found that of farmers who thought they had suffered predation 11% were of the opinion that badgers were responsible for some of their losses, although a majority of these did not actually witness an attack. The report also points out that predation (by many species, not just badgers) is often both misidentified and overestimated which makes it difficult to conclude an accurate figure for badger attacks.
Crows such as the hooded crow are known to kill lambs, often first disabling them by pecking out their eyes; if a sheep has fallen over during parturition or bad weather and cannot get up, again crows will first attack their eyes. Larger predatory birds such as golden eagles and white-tailed eagle may pose a threat to sheep in the north of Britain, where their ranges remain stable, but studies show that overall levels of predation are likely to be low (in the order of 1-3%), although a small number of farmers may occasionally suffer slightly higher losses.

Mainland Europe
In Greece, between April 1989 and June 1991, 21,000 sheep and goats were killed by wolves. In 1998 it was 5,894 sheep and goats.

In southern Bulgaria, golden jackals were recorded to have attacked 1,053 sheep between 1982–87.

Asia
A study on livestock predation taken in Tibet showed that the wolf was the most prominent predator, accounting for 60% of the total livestock losses, followed by the snow leopard (38%) and Eurasian lynx (2%). Sheep were the second most targeted victims after goats, amounting to over 30% of losses.

Prevention

Sheep producers have used a wide variety of measures to try to combat predation throughout history. Pre-modern shepherds had only the most basic of tools: their own presence, livestock guardian dogs, and protective structures such as barns and fencing. Fencing (both regular and electric), penning sheep at night and lambing indoors all continue to be widely–used methods of protection today. Whereas sheepdogs herd sheep, guardian dogs are trained to integrate into flocks and protect them from predators. The ability of these dogs to do so is a transference of the canine pack social structure on to a flock. Following their invention, the focus in dealing with predators shifted to the nearly exclusive use of guns, traps, and poisons to kill predators both defensively and preemptively. The population of predator species plummeted worldwide, pushing some to extinction (such as the thylacine) or significantly reducing their original ranges. With the appearance of the environmental and conservation movements, and subsequent state, provincial, national and international legislation, simply exterminating predator species failed to be a legally viable option for protecting flocks. However, many countries maintain government agencies—such as the Wildlife Services program, a wing of the USDA's Animal and Plant Health Inspection Service —to shoot, poison and trap predators that threaten sheep. Wildlife conservation organizations charge that this killing is both indiscriminate and ineffective at protecting sheep.

The 1970s saw an ensuing resurgence in the use of livestock guardian dogs and the development of new methods of predator control, many of them non–lethal. Donkeys and guard llamas or alpacas have been used since the 1980s in sheep operations, using the same basic principle as livestock guardian dogs. Interspecific pasturing, usually with larger livestock such as cattle or horses, make also help to deter predators, even if such species do not actively guard sheep. In addition to animal guardians, contemporary sheep operations may use non–lethal predator deterrents such as motion–activated lights and noisy alarms. While these devices have been shown to be successful, predators can become habituated to them.

In fiction
In the Dick King-Smith novel The Sheep-Pig and its 1995 film adaptation, Arthur Hoggett's sheep were attacked by wild dogs with one of them, Maa being killed.

References

External links
 Livestock predation guide, including species guides and photos of sheep predation by the Cooperative Extension Service at Texas A&M University
 An economic evaluation of Red Fox predation in Australia

Sheep
Predation